The 1824 Vermont gubernatorial election took place in September and October, and resulted in the election of Cornelius P. Van Ness to a one-year term as governor.

The Vermont General Assembly met in Montpelier on October 14. The Vermont House of Representatives appointed a committee to review the votes of the freemen of Vermont for governor, lieutenant governor, treasurer, and members of the governor's council. Democratic-Republican Cornelius P. Van Ness was the only major candidate. The committee determined that Van Ness had easily won a second one-year term against only token opposition.

In the election for lieutenant governor, the committee determined that Democratic-Republican Aaron Leland had won election to a third one-year term against only scattering opposition. A Vermont newspaper reported the results as: Leland, 14,166 (98.4%); scattering, 220 (1.6%).

Benjamin Swan was unopposed for election to a one-year term as treasurer, his twenty-fifth. Though he had nominally been a Federalist, Swan was usually endorsed by the Democratic-Republicans and even after the demise of the Federalists he was frequently unopposed. Vermont newspapers indicated that the results were: Swan, 12,743 (99.9%); scattering, 14 (0.1%).

In the race for governor, the results of the popular vote were reported as follows.

Results

References

Vermont gubernatorial elections
gubernatorial
Vermont